WPUT may refer to:

 WPUT (FM), a radio station (90.1 FM) licensed to serve North Salem, New York, United States
 WPUT (defunct), a defunct radio station (1510 AM) formerly licensed to serve Brewster, New York